Twyla (also Twila) is a given name. Notable people with the name include:

Twyla
 Twyla Hansen (born 1949), American poet, a Nebraska State Poet
 Twyla Herbert (1921–2009), American songwriter
 Twyla King (1937-2022), American newspaper editor and politician from Minnesota
 Twyla Mason Gray (1954–2011), American politician from Oklahoma
 Twyla Roman (born 1941), American politician from Ohio
 Twyla Tharp (born 1941), American dancer, choreographer, and author
 Twyla Sands, a character on the television series Schitt's Creek
 Twyla, the daughter of a boogeyman from Monster High

Twila
 Twila Paris (born 1958), American singer-songwriter, author, and pianist
 Twila Shively (1920–1999), American baseball outfielder

Feminine given names